Ousmane Sembène (1 January 1923 or 8 January 1923 – 9 June 2007), often credited in the French style as Sembène Ousmane in articles and reference works, was a Senegalese film director, producer and writer. The Los Angeles Times considered him one of the greatest authors of Africa and he has often been called the "father of African film". Descended from a Serer family through his mother from the line of Matar Sène, Ousmane Sembène was particularly drawn to Serer religious festivals especially the Tuur festival.

Early life
The son of a fisherman, Ousmane Sembène was born in Ziguinchor in Casamance to a Lebou family. From childhood he was exposed to the Serer religion especially the Tuur festival, in which he was made "cult servant". Although the Tuur demands offerings of curdled milk to the ancestral spirits (Pangool), Sembène did not take his responsibility as cult servant seriously and was known for drinking the offerings made to the ancestors. Some of his adult work draws on Serer themes. His maternal grandmother reared him and greatly influenced him. Women play a major role in his works.

Sembène's knowledge of French and basic Arabic besides Wolof, his mother tongue, followed his attendance at a madrasa, as was common for many Muslim boys, and a French school until 1936, when he clashed with the principal. Sembène worked with his father—he was prone to seasickness—until 1938, then moved to Dakar, where he worked a variety of manual labour jobs.

In 1944, Sembène was drafted into the Senegalese Tirailleurs (a corps of the French Army). His later World War II service was with the Free French Forces. After the war, he returned to his home country and in 1947 participated in a long railroad strike, on which he later based his seminal novel God's Bits of Wood (1960).

Late in 1947, he stowed away to France, where he worked at a Citroën factory in Paris and then on the docks at Marseille, becoming active in the French trade union movement. He joined the communist-led CGT and the Communist party, helping lead a strike to hinder the shipment of weapons for the French colonial war in Vietnam. During this time, he discovered the Harlem Renaissance writer Claude McKay and the Haitian Marxist writer Jacques Roumain.

Early literary career
Sembène taught himself to read and write in French and later drew on many of his life experiences in his French-language first novel, Le Docker Noir (The Black Docker, 1956), the story of Diaw, an African stevedore who faces racism and mistreatment on the docks at Marseille. Diaw writes a novel, which is later stolen by a white woman and published under her name; he confronts her, accidentally kills her, and is tried and executed in scenes highly reminiscent of Albert Camus's The Stranger (also translated as The Outsider). Though the book focuses particularly on the mistreatment of African immigrants, Sembène also details the oppression of Arab and Spanish workers, making it clear that the issues concern xenophobia as much as they do race. Like most of his fiction, it is written in a social realist mode. Many critics today consider the book somewhat flawed; however, it began Sembène's literary reputation and provided him with the financial support to continue writing.

Sembène's second novel, O Pays, mon beau peuple! (Oh country, my beautiful people!, 1957), tells the story of Oumar, an ambitious black farmer returning to his native Casamance with a new white wife and ideas for modernizing the area's agricultural practices. However, Oumar struggles against both the French colonial government and the village social order, and is eventually murdered. O Pays, mon beau peuple! was an international success, giving Sembène invitations from around the world, particularly from Communist countries such as China, Cuba, and the Soviet Union.

Sembène's third and most famous novel is Les Bouts de Bois de Dieu (God's Bits of Wood, 1960); most critics consider it his masterpiece, rivaled only by Xala. The novel fictionalizes the real-life story of a railroad strike on the Dakar-Niger line that lasted from 1947 to 1948. Though the charismatic and brilliant union spokesman, Ibrahima Bakayoko, is the most central figure, the novel has no true hero except the community itself, which bands together in the face of hardship and oppression to assert their rights. Accordingly, the novel features nearly fifty characters in both Senegal and neighboring Mali, showing the strike from all possible angles; in this, the novel is often compared to Émile Zola's Germinal.

Sembène followed Les Bouts de Bois de Dieu with the (1962) short fiction collection Voltaïque (Tribal Scars). The collection contains short stories, tales, and fables, including "La Noire de..." which he would later adapt into his first film. In 1964, he released l'Harmattan (The Harmattan), an epic novel about a referendum for independence in an African capital.

From 1962 to 1963, Sembène studied filmmaking for a year at Gorky Film Studio, Moscow, under Soviet director Mark Donskoy.

Later literary career
With the 1965 publication of Le mandat, précédé de Vehi-Ciosane (The Money Order and White Genesis), Sembène's emphasis began to shift. Just as he had once vociferously attacked the racial and economic oppression of the French colonial government, with this pair of novellas, he turned his sights on the corrupt African elites that followed. He was one of the contributors of Lotus which was launched in Cairo in 1968 and financed by Egypt and the Soviet Union.

Sembène continued this theme with the 1973 novel Xala, the story of an El Hadji Abdou Kader Beye, a rich businessman struck by what he believes to be a curse of impotence ("xala" in Wolof) on the night of his wedding to his beautiful, young third wife. El Hadji grows obsessed with removing the curse through visits to marabouts, but only after losing most of his money and reputation does he discover the source to be the beggar who lives outside his offices, whom he wronged in acquiring his fortune.

Le Dernier de l’empire (The Last of the Empire, 1981), Sembène's last novel, depicts corruption and an eventual military coup in a newly independent African nation. His paired 1987 novellas Niiwam et Taaw (Niiwam and Taaw) continue to explore social and moral collapse in urban Senegal.

On the strength of Les Bouts de Bois de Dieu and Xala, Sembène is considered one of the leading figures in African postcolonial literature. Samba Gadjigo writes, "Of Sembène's ten published literary works, seven have been translated into English"; whereas Nigerian pioneer writers Chinua Achebe and Wole Soyinka wrote in English.

Film
As an author concerned with social change, Sembène wished to touch a wide audience. He realized that his written works would reach only the cultural elites, but that films were "the people's night school" and could reach a much broader African audience.

In 1963, Sembène produced his first film, a short called Barom Sarret (The Wagoner). In 1964 he made another short entitled Niaye. In 1966 he produced his first feature film, La Noire de..., based on one of his own short stories; it was the first feature film ever released by a sub-Saharan African director. Though only 60 minutes long, the French-language film won the Prix Jean Vigo, bringing immediate international attention to both African film generally and Sembène specifically. Sembène followed this success with the 1968 Mandabi, achieving his dream of producing a film in his native Wolof language.

Later Wolof-language films include Xala (1975, based on his own novel), Ceddo (1977), Camp de Thiaroye (1987), and Guelwaar (1992). The Senegalese release of Ceddo was heavily censored, ostensibly for a problem with Sembène's paperwork, though some critics suggest that this censorship had more to do with what could be interpreted as anti-Muslim content in the film. However, Sembène distributed fliers at theaters describing the censored scenes and released the film uncut for the international market. In 1971, Sembène also made a film in French and Diola entitled Emitaï, which was entered into the 7th Moscow International Film Festival, where it won a Silver Prize. It was also banned throughout French West Africa. His 1975 film Xala was entered into the 9th Moscow International Film Festival.

In 1977 his film Ceddo was entered into the 10th Moscow International Film Festival. In the same year he was a member of the jury at the 27th Berlin International Film Festival. At the 11th Moscow International Film Festival in 1979, he was awarded with the Honorable Prize for the contribution to cinema.

Recurrent themes of Sembène's films are the history of colonialism, the failings of religion, the critique of the new African bourgeoisie, and the strength of African women.

His final film, the 2004 feature Moolaadé, won awards at the 2004 Cannes Film Festival and the FESPACO Film Festival in Ouagadougou, Burkina Faso. The film, set in a small African village in Burkina Faso, explored the controversial subject of female genital mutilation.

He is the subject of the 2015 documentary film, Sembene!.

Sembène often makes a cameo appearance in his films. For example, in Mandabi he plays the letter writer at the post office.

Death
Ousmane Sembène died on 9 June 2007, at the age of 84. He had been ill since December 2006, and died at his home in Dakar, Senegal where he was buried in a shroud adorned with Quranic verses. Sembène was survived by three sons from two marriages.

Seipati Bulane Hopa, Secretary General of the Pan African Federation of Filmmakers (FEPACI) described Sembène as "a luminary that lit the torch for ordinary people to walk the path of light...a voice that spoke without hesitation, a man with an impeccable talent who unwaveringly held on to his artistic principles and did that with great integrity and dignity."

South Africa's Pallo Jordan, Minister of Arts and Culture, went further in eulogizing Sembène as "a well rounded intellectual and an exceptionally cultured humanist...an informed social critic [who] provided the world with an alternative knowledge of Africa."

Works

Books 
Le Docker noir (novel) – Paris: Debresse, 1956; new edition Présence Africaine, 2002; trans. as The Black Docker, London: Heinemann, 1987.
O Pays, mon beau peuple! (novel) – 1957
Les bouts de bois de Dieu (novel) – 1960; trans. as God's Bits of Wood, London: Heinemann, 1995.
Voltaïque (short stories) – Paris: Présence Africaine, 1962; trans. as Tribal Scars, Washington: INSCAPE, 1975.
L’Harmattan (novel) – Paris: Présence Africaine, 1964.
Le mandat, précédé de Vehi-Ciosane – Paris: Présence Africaine, 1966; trans. as The Money-Order with White Genesis, London: Heinemann, 1987.
Xala, Paris: Présence Africaine, 1973.
Le dernier de l'Empire (novel) – L'Harmattan, 1981; trans. as The Last of the Empire, London: Heinemann, 1983; "a key to Senegalese politics" – Werner Glinga.
Niiwam – Paris: Présence Africaine, 1987; trans. as Niiwam and Taaw: Two Novellas (Oxford and Portsmouth, N.H.: Heinemann, 1992).

Selected filmography 
Borom Sarret (1963)
Niaye (1964)
La Noire de...(1966)
Mandabi (1968)
Emitaï (1971)
Xala (1975)
Ceddo (1977)
Camp de Thiaroye (1988)
Guelwaar (1992)
Faat Kiné (2000)
Moolaadé (2004)

Further reading
Annas, Max & Busch, Annett: Ousmane Sembene: Interviews. University Press, Mississippi, 2008.
Adeniyi, Idowu Emmanuel. "Male Other, Female Self and Post-feminist Consciousness in Sembène Ousmane’s God’s Bits of Wood and Flora Nwapa’s Efuru." Ibadan Journal of English Studies 7 (2019):57-72.
Gadjigo, Samba. Ousmane Sembène: Dialogues with Critics and Writers. Amherst: University of Massachusetts Press, 1993.
Mumin, Nijla. Caméras d’Afrique: Elvis Mitchell On West African Cinema and The Need for Diverse Film Criticism (Interview). IndieWire, October 4, 2013.
Murphy, David. Imagining Alternatives in Film and Fiction – Sembene. Oxford: Africa World Press Inc., 2001.
Niang, Sada. Littérature et cinéma en afrique francophone: Ousmane Sembène et Assia Djebar. Paris: L’Harmattan, 1996.
Niang, Sada & Samba Gadjigo. "Interview with Ousmane Sembene." Research in African Literatures 26:3 (Fall 1995): 174–178.
Pfaff, Françoise. The Cinema of Ousmane Sembene: A Pioneer of African Film. Westport, Connecticut: Greenwood Press, 1984.
Rubaba, Protas Pius. "The influence of feminist communication in creating social transformation: an analysis of the films Moolaade (Ousmane Sembene) and Water (Deepa Mehta)." Nelson Mandela Metropolitan University: PhD diss., 2009.
Vieyra, Paulin Soumanou. Ousmane Sembène cineaste: première période, 1962–1971. Paris: Présence Africaine, 1972.

References

External links
Ousmane Sembène: Biography and works at Emory University

OUSMANE SEMBENE: THE LIFE OF A REVOLUTIONARY ARTIST
Ousmane Sembène — father of African film, interview on release of Moolaadé, Socialist Worker, 11 June 2005 
(AFP 10 June 2007): African Cinema Pioneer Ousmane Sembene dies.
(New York Times, 11 June 2007) Obituary: Ousmane Sembène, 84, Dies; Led Cinema's Advance in Africa
 "An Appraisal: A Filmmaker Who Found Africa’s Voice" by A.O. Scott, The New York Times, 12 June 2007
 The articles on Sembene on the Africultures website
 Ousmane Sembene: Interviews. Preface on the missingimage website.
Interview 12 October 2004 on WNYC; 31 minutes. (RealPlayer).
 Selected lines of the book "Ousmane Sembène Interviews", Cineafrique.org
Gadjigo, Samba. Ousmane Sembène . Bloomington: Indiana University Press, 2010.
Sembène: The Making of African Cinema (1994), a film by Manthia Diawara and Ngũgĩ wa Thiong'o

In French
 Web page devoted to Ousmane Sembène , Senegalaisement.com
 Portrait of Ousmane Sembène, courrierinternational.com
 Sembène the Ceddo, Africultures.com
 Masterclass of Sembene Ousmane at the Cannes Film Festival 2005
 interview of Sembene Ousmane by Olivier Barlet, Africultures.com
 One of the last interviews of Sembene Ousmane by Anoumou Amekudji, Cineafrique.org

On the film Moolaadé
 Interview with Ousmane Sembène in l’Humanité newspaper, 15 May 2004.
 Interview with actress Fatoumata Coulibaly, on the website Africultures.
 The critic of Moolade on Africultures.
 Ousmane Sembène: Mooladé (Film Review) Stichproben: Wiener Zeitschrift für kritische Afrikaforschung/ Vienna Journal of African Studies, 2006.

1920s births
2007 deaths
Lebou people
People from Ziguinchor
Senegalese film directors
Senegalese film producers
Senegalese novelists
French Communist Party members
French military personnel of World War II
People of French West Africa
Activists against female genital mutilation
Cinema pioneers
20th-century novelists
Wolof-language writers